Rahul Kumar (born 21 September 1984) is an Indian politician of Janta Dal United from the state of Bihar, India, was a member of the Bihar Legislative Assembly for Term 2010 - 2015 from Ghosi (Vidhan Sabha constituency). His father, Dr. Jagdish Sharma, was also, a member of the JDU and an MP from Jehanabad Bihar. Kumar defeated Jagdish Prasad alias Kaushal Yadav of LJP in Ghosi (Vidhan Sabha constituency) seat in 2010 Vidhan Sabha elections, in Jehanabad district of Bihar.

Early life and education 
Rahul Kumar was born on 21 September 1984 in Korra village in Ghosi area in Jehanabad district of Bihar. His father Dr. Jagdish Sharma was Member of Parliament, and his mother, Shanti Devi, was a Member of the Legislative Assembly. He completed his education Ramakrishna Mission Vidyapith, Deoghar after completing his graduation and Management from Symbiosis University of Applied Sciences, Pune he worked at the Japanese company Sona Koyo in Gurgaon.

Political career 
From 2015 to 2019, Kumar was a member of Hindustani Awam Morcha, a centre-left political party associated with the United Progressive Alliance. In 2019, he joined Janata Dal, another centre-left party with socialist ideals. 

He was elected to the Bihar Legislative Assembly from the Ghosi (Vidhan Sabha constituency) as a member of the Janata Dal (United) in 2010.

In 2014, he visited United States to participate in ACYPL conference and delivered a lecture on an election exchange programme.

References

External links
Articles in Times Of India about Rahul Kumar
Rahul Kumar : Membership of Legislature

1984 births
Living people
Politics of Jehanabad district
Hindustani Awam Morcha politicians
Janata Dal (United) politicians
People from Jehanabad district
Bihar MLAs 2010–2015
https://vidhansabha.bih.nic.in/pdf/ex%20mla/15.pdf